The Rumba Foundation is the seventh studio album by New Flamenco artist Jesse Cook. It was released on September 29, 2009.

Track listing

Charts and certifications

References

Jesse Cook albums